Below is a list of squads used in the 1984 African Nations Cup.

Group A

Coach:  Radivoje Ognjanović

Coach:  David Duque Ferreira

Coach: Saleh El Wahsh

Coach:  Gottlieb Göller

Group B

Coach: Mahieddine Khalef

Coach : Emmanuel Kwasi Afranie

Coach:  Danny McLennan

Coach: Festus Onigbinde

External links
FIFA

Africa Cup of Nations squads
squads